Sarah (also Romanized as Sarāḩ; also known as Aḩmadī, Sarāḩ-e Aḩmadī, Sarā-ye Aḩmadī, and Serāh-e Aḩmadī) is a village in Ahmadi Rural District, Ahmadi District, Hajjiabad County, Hormozgan Province, Iran. At the 2006 census, its population was 453, in 85 families.

References 

Populated places in Hajjiabad County